The Water Supply Water Quality Regulations 1989 (SI No. 1147) are regulations imposed on the England and Wales Water industry by statutory instrument. The regulations were signed jointly by Peter Walker, Secretary of State for Wales and Michael Howard who, as Minister for Water and Planning, was responsible for implementing water privatization in England and Wales during 1988/89. Most of the measures came into force on 1 September 1989, and the rest on 1 January 1990. The regulations have been superseded by several later instruments.

Revocation 
The 1989 regulations were revoked in England by the Water Supply (Water Quality) Regulations (SI 2000/3184) and in Wales by the Water Supply (Water Quality) Regulations (SI 2001/3911). Further changes were made by the Water Industry Act 1991.

Wholesomeness 
Schedule 2 of the regulations prescribes concentrations for substances that affect wholesomeness.

Table A

Table B

(i) The sum of the detected concentrations of fluoranthene, benzo 3.4 fluoranthene, benzo 11.12 fluoranthene, benzo 3.4 pyrene, benzo 1.12 perylene and indeno (1,2,3-cd) pyrene.

Table C

Table D

Table E

See also 

 List of Statutory Instruments of the United Kingdom, 1989
 Drinking water quality standards
 Hard Water
 Soft Water
 Water quality
 Water softener
 Water treatment
 Water purification

References

External links 
  – later legislation

Statutory Instruments of the United Kingdom
1989 in British law
Water supply and sanitation in England and Wales
Drinking water regulation